George Jeffery may refer to:

 George Jeffery (cricketer) (1853–1891), English cricketer
 George Jeffery (politician) (1920–1989), Australian politician
 George Barker Jeffery (1891–1957), mathematical physicist
 George Jeffery (rugby union) (1861–1937), English rugby union player, see List of England national rugby union players

See also
 George Jeffrey (1916–1979), Scottish footballer
 George Jeffreys (disambiguation)